Branden Albert (born November 4, 1984) is a former American football offensive tackle who played nine seasons in the National Football League (NFL). He played college football at Virginia and was drafted by the Kansas City Chiefs 15th overall in the 2008 NFL Draft. He also played for the Miami Dolphins and was a member of Jacksonville Jaguars before announcing his retirement in 2017.

Early years
Albert grew up in a single-parent home in Rochester, New York. His mother, Susan Albert, decided to send him to Washington, D.C., where his older brother Ashley Sims, a defensive lineman for the Maryland Terrapins from 1994 to 1997, worked as a probation officer. As a junior at Glen Burnie High School, he started playing football. He was also a part of the basketball team, which made it to the state finals the final two years of Albert's career.

Considered only a two-star recruit by Rivals.com, Albert was not ranked among the nation's top recruits. Because he had played football for only one season, but also because of Albert's poor grades, the University of Virginia was the only school to recruit Albert, first helping him enroll at Hargrave Military Academy in Chatham, Va to improve his grades, and subsequently offering him a scholarship.

College career
Still struggling academically, Albert spent the 2004 season at Hargrave Military Academy. He played football and was able to obtain a qualifying grade-point average and standardized test score. Albert would later credit Hargrave and coach Robert Prunty for his later success.

Albert started all 37 games during his three-year career at Virginia, mostly at the offensive guard position as D'Brickashaw Ferguson and later five-star recruit Eugene Monroe occupied the left tackle spot. He was only the second Virginia freshman since 1972 to start on the offensive line. Albert earned first-team All-Atlantic Coast Conference honors as a junior.

Professional career

2008 NFL Draft
Albert was the first guard taken in the draft, as well as the second Virginia Cavalier (behind No. 2 pick Chris Long). He was the highest selected guard since Chris Naeole went 10th overall to the New Orleans Saints in the 1997 NFL Draft.

Kansas City Chiefs

On July 24, 2008, Albert signed a five-year contract with the Chiefs. It was announced by the Chiefs that he would be moved to the tackle position, though he played guard at Virginia. Despite missing all four preseason games with a foot injury suffered at training camp, Albert still managed to start 15 games at left tackle (only missing Week 5 at Carolina due to an elbow injury). He allowed just 4.5 sacks in 2008, and the only penalty called against him all season was a false start.

With high expectations, 2009 was a disappointing struggle for Albert. He committed 10 penalties and his 9 sacks allowed were the fifth most in the league. He missed Week 6 and 7 with an ankle injury but started the other 14 games. Despite his struggles, Albert finished the season a little stronger allowing no sacks in the final three games. Head coach Todd Haley later called his 2009 performance an "adjustment period" after losing nearly 40 pounds the last offseason in his request.

Albert started 15 games in 2010 and has established himself as the Chiefs left tackle. He started 16 games in the 2011 season at left tackle, occasionally covering left guard due to the acquisition of Jared Gaither from the Baltimore Ravens.

Albert received the Chiefs franchise tag March 5, 2013.

Albert would have his best season in 2013 albeit playing in only 12 games. He was a key component in Kansas City's run scheme led by Jamaal Charles who totaled 1980 all purpose yards. Albert made it to the 2013 Pro Bowl.

Miami Dolphins
On March 11, 2014, Albert signed a five-year, $47 million contract with the Miami Dolphins. At the conclusion of the 2015 NFL season, Albert was selected to play in his second Pro Bowl.

Jacksonville Jaguars
On March 9, 2017, Albert was traded to the Jacksonville Jaguars for tight end Julius Thomas. However, on July 31, 2017, Albert announced his retirement after nine seasons in the league, saying: "GOD has blessed me with so much through football that I thought would never be attainable. It’s been truly a blessing. I cherish all of the relationships and people I have encountered while playing in the NFL!" After spending just over a week retired, Albert expressed interest in returning to the NFL and the Jaguars. On August 8, 2017, the Jaguars moved Albert from the "left team" list to the reserve/retired list after expressing interest in returning. On August 11, 2017, Albert was officially released by the Jaguars.

Personal
Albert was arrested after he punched a large hole in a display cabinet in a jewelry store in Georgia in February 2018. He had entered an area that was only for staff, then asked to leave, after which he punched the cabinet. The police were called and Albert was tased twice. After the arrest he reached a deal where he paid for the damages and pledged 40 hours of community service, while also having to undergo a mental health examination.

References

External links

Jacksonville Jaguars bio
Miami Dolphins bio
Kansas City Chiefs bio
University of Virginia Cavaliers bio

1984 births
Living people
African-American players of American football
American football offensive guards
American football offensive tackles
Jacksonville Jaguars players
Kansas City Chiefs players
Miami Dolphins players
People from Glen Burnie, Maryland
Players of American football from Maryland
Players of American football from New York (state)
Sportspeople from Anne Arundel County, Maryland
Sportspeople from Rochester, New York
Unconferenced Pro Bowl players
Virginia Cavaliers football players
Hargrave Military Academy alumni
21st-century African-American sportspeople
20th-century African-American people
Ed Block Courage Award recipients